Sir David Cunyninghame of Milncraig, 1st Baronet (died 28 January 1708) was a Scottish landowner, lawyer and politician. He was a distinguished advocate, an eloquent commissioner to Parliament, and the friend and coadjutor of Andrew Fletcher of Saltoun. He was created a baronet of Nova Scotia on 3 February 1702, to him and his "heirs successive".

A son of David Cunynghame of Milncraig (died 1659) by his spouse, Margaret, daughter of John Masoun of Rosebank, Burgh Clerk of Ayr, his paternal inherited estates were Milncraig, Ayrshire, and Livingston, West Lothian.

Sir David married, firstly, to Isobell, youngest daughter of Sir James Dalrymple, 1st Viscount of Stair. He married, secondly, on 16 March 1698, to Elizabeth, daughter of Sir Robert Baird, 1st Baronet of Saughtonhall.

Successors
He was succeeded by his eldest son, Sir James Cunynghame of Milncraig, 2nd Baronet, Member of Parliament for Linlithgowshire (1715–1722), who died unmarried on 1 February 1747. He was succeeded in the baronetcy by his brother, David, a Lieutenant-General in the Army.

References

 The Scottish Nation, by William Anderson, 1867 edition, volume 3, p. 747.
 Burke's Peerage, Baronetage, and Knightage, edited by Peter Townend, 105th edition, London, 1970, page 712.

17th-century births
1708 deaths
Baronets in the Baronetage of Nova Scotia
Scottish lawyers
Members of the Parliament of Scotland 1702–1707
Burgh Commissioners to the Parliament of Scotland
Members of the Faculty of Advocates
Scottish landowners
Year of birth unknown